The 1997 Argentine Grand Prix was a Formula One motor race held at Autódromo Oscar Alfredo Gálvez in Buenos Aires, Argentina on 13 April 1997. It was the third race of the 1997 Formula One World Championship, and the 600th World Championship Grand Prix.

The 72-lap race was won from pole position by Jacques Villeneuve, driving a Williams-Renault. Eddie Irvine finished second in a Ferrari, while Ralf Schumacher, in only his third F1 race, finished third in a Jordan-Peugeot.

Summary

Pre-Race
Most of the talk before the grand prix was about Heinz-Harald Frentzen and Eddie Irvine and their poor starts to the season. Despite going out of business, Lola Team Principal Eric Broadley was confident that the team could be up and running again by the San Marino Grand Prix, albeit with a new main sponsor. The Tyrrell team also caused a stir after arriving at the grand prix with four new wings on the car, two on the nose cone, the other two alongside the drivers head. They resembled x-wings and this was soon used as their nickname. The practice session bought no surprises with the two Williams cars first and second.

Qualifying
As with the practice session, both Williams were once again on the front row, with Jacques Villeneuve on pole. The first real surprise of the weekend was the performance of Olivier Panis in the Prost, who managed to qualify third on the grid. Another strong performance was the fifth place of Rubens Barrichello in the Stewart. As expected, both McLarens qualified low down the field, complaining of poor handling on the bumpy surface. The slowest qualifier Pedro Diniz's lap time would have still been comfortably fast enough to have put him on pole for the previous year's race.

Race
As the red lights went out, Jacques Villeneuve cleanly navigated the first corner and began to pull away from the other front runners. Michael Schumacher (who was unsighted by oil from Frentzen's car) almost collided with Panis, but the Frenchman moved off line to drop a few places rather than to collide with the Ferrari. Going into the first corner, Michael Schumacher was alongside his teammate Irvine and Rubens Barrichello. However, Michael then understeered and crashed into the back of Barrichello's car causing the Brazilian to spin and getting himself to retire. Barrichello would eventually change his front nose and get going again. But in the melee, Coulthard crashed into the back of Ralf Schumacher's Jordan, ripping of his front wheel and putting him out of the race. The track was unpassable with the back of the field taking to the grass to get round the incident, so the Safety Car was called out. At the restart after 4 laps, Villeneuve once again pulled away from Frentzen and Panis, but Frentzen's race ended on lap 6 with throttle problems. The chance of victory for Prost ended on lap 18, also with throttle problems. On lap 24 the two Jordans collided with Giancarlo Fisichella retiring from the race. Hill, who was up to 4th at one point, retired with engine failure on lap 33. Although in the final few laps Irvine closed the gap to Villeneuve, the Canadian held tight and went on to win his sixth career grand prix. Irvine finished second, the highest finish of his career at that point, with Ralf Schumacher scoring his first podium in third.

Post-race
On the podium the organisers mistakenly flew the Irish tricolour for Irvine, instead of the Union Jack that was usually flown for Northern Irish drivers. Although Irvine identifies himself as Irish despite holding a British passport, his parents' house in County Down was targeted by loyalists as they felt they had been betrayed by the Ferrari driver. Irvine subsequently asked for a white flag with a shamrock to be used if he secured another podium finish; however, the FIA insisted that the Union Jack be used in future.

Classification

Qualifying

Race

Championship standings after the race

Drivers' Championship standings

Constructors' Championship standings

References 

Race Details: 

Argentine Grand Prix
Argentine Grand Prix
Grand Prix
Argentine Grand Prix